Selskabet Kjæden (English: The Society of the Chain), formerly known as Kjæde-ordenen (English: The Order of the Chain), is a fraternal, philanthropical society based in Copenhagen, Denmark. The society has since 1811 been involved in work for blind people. Princess Elisabeth of Denmark is protector of the organization. Its building, situated at Klerkegade 10, was listed in the Danish national registry of protected buildings and places by the Danish Heritage Agency on  1 October 1989.

History
The Order of the Chain is believed to have originated in St Canute's Guild in the 12th century. The Order of the Chain terminated its activities in the late 17th century but it was revived by a group of former freemasons on 27 November 1774. Membership of the order has been open to both men and women from the time of its foundation. The order has been engaged in social-philanthropical work since 1780. One of its first projects was to raise the necessary 100 rigsdaler for the construction of the first public school in Bornholm.

Building
The Society of the Chain is headquartered in a low Renaissance Revival style building at Klerkegade 10 in Copenhagen. The design is by Vilhelm Tvede. It was´listed in 1989.

Activities
From 1811 the order has been involved in work for the blind. In 1858, it financed the construction of the Royal Institute for the Blind which was ceded to the Danish state upon its completion. In 1876, it expanded its headquarters with two new wings which were used as a home for blind people. It remained in use until 1971.

Since  1829-30, the order has also catered to the poor in Copenhagen.

See also
 Royal Copenhagen Shooting Society

References

Further reading
 Collin. Edgar: In Mindeblade ved Deres Kgl. Højheder, Kronprins Frederik og Kronprinsesse Louise's Sølvbryllup, Copenhagen 1894.
 Poulsen,Svenn :  Kjædeordenen og Blindesagen i hundrede Aar. Copenhagen 1911.

External links

 Official website

Masonic organizations
Organizations based in Copenhagen
1774 establishments in Denmark
Buildings and structures completed in 1869
Listed buildings and structures in Copenhagen